Yegor Nikolayevich Kondakov (born 26 November 1998) is a Russian football player.

Club career
He made his debut in the Russian Professional Football League for FC Chertanovo Moscow on 6 May 2015 in a game against FC Lokomotiv Liski. He made his Russian Football National League debut for Chertanovo on 25 May 2019 in a game against FC Rotor Volgograd.

References

External links
 Profile by Russian Professional Football League

1998 births
Living people
Russian footballers
Russia youth international footballers
Association football defenders
FC Chertanovo Moscow players
Russian First League players
Russian Second League players